Samuel R. Madden (born August 4, 1976) is an American computer scientist specializing in database management systems. He is currently a professor of computer science at the Massachusetts Institute of Technology.

Career
Madden was born and raised in San Diego, California. After completing bachelor's and master's degrees at MIT, he earned a Ph.D. specializing in database management at the University of California Berkeley under Michael Franklin and Joseph M. Hellerstein. Before joining MIT as a tenure-track professor, Madden held a post-doc position at Intel's Berkeley Research center.

Madden has been involved in a number database research projects, including TinyDB, TelegraphCQ, Aurora/Borealis, C-Store, and H-Store. In 2005, at the age of 29 he was named to the TR35 as one of the Top 35 Innovators Under 35 by MIT Technology Review magazine. Recent projects include DataHub - a "github for data" platform that provides hosted database storage, versioning, ingest, search, and visualization (commercialized as Instabase), CarTel - a distributed wireless platform that monitors traffic and on-board diagnostic conditions in order to generate road surface reports, and Relational Cloud - a project investigating research issues in building a database-as-a-service.  Madden's has published more than 250 scholarly articles, with more than 59,000 citations, with an h-index of 101.

In addition, Madden is a co-founder of Cambridge Mobile Telematics and  Vertica Systems. Before enrolling at MIT and while an undergraduate student there, Madden wrote printer driver software for Palomar Software, a San Diego-area Macintosh software company.  He is also a Technology Expert Partner at Omega Venture Partners.

Education

 Ph.D., Computer Science, 2003. University of California Berkeley.
 M.Eng., Electrical Engineering and Computer Science, 1999.  Massachusetts Institute of Technology.
 B.S., Electrical Engineering and Computer Science, 1999. Massachusetts Institute of Technology.
 Morse High School, 1994.  Samuel F.B. Morse High School.

References

1976 births
Living people
American computer scientists
Massachusetts Institute of Technology alumni
Massachusetts Institute of Technology faculty
People from San Diego
University of California, Berkeley alumni